Gentiana sino-ornata, the showy Chinese gentian, is a species of flowering plant in the family Gentianaceae, native to western China and Tibet.

It is suitable for growing in a rock or alpine garden. This plant has gained the Royal Horticultural Society's Award of Garden Merit.

References

sino-ornata
Flora of China
Flora of Tibet
Taxa named by Isaac Bayley Balfour